The A10 motorway is a motorway in southern Croatia extending from the border with Bosnia and Herzegovina to the Croatian A1 motorway Ploče interchange. The motorway includes the Nova Sela border crossing. It connects to the A1 motorway in Bosnia and Herzegovina. It is the shortest motorway in Croatia, but still important as a part of the Pan-European Corridor Vc.

History 

On 15 May 2007, the Croatian Government and the Government of Bosnia and Herzegovina signed a Protocol on cooperation that defined the contact point of the Croatian and Bosnian-Herzegovinian motorways on the Corridor Vc, which caused a significant alteration of the Croatian A1 route near Vrgorac as well as a complete revamp of the A10 route.

Scheduled in 2011 to open in 2013, the A10 was opened in late 2013.

Traffic volume
Traffic is regularly counted and reported by Hrvatske autoceste, the operator of the motorway, and the results are published by Hrvatske ceste. The volume tracked includes the annual average daily traffic (AADT) and average summer daily traffic (ASDT).

Exit list

{| class="wikitable"
|- 
!scope="col"|County
!scope="col"|km
!scope="col"|Exit
!scope="col"|Name
!scope="col"|Destination
!scope="col"|Notes
|-
| rowspan=5 |Dubrovnik-Neretva
| 0.4
| align=center |
| Nova Sela border crossing
|  A1
| Nova Sela border crossing to Bosnia and Herzegovina, where the road continues as the A1 motorway towards Mostar.The eastern terminus of the motorway.
|-
| 0.9
| align=center | 1
| Kula Norinska
| 
| Connection to Kula Norinska and Metković (D9).
|-
| 1.6
| align=center |
| colspan=2 |Čarapine toll plaza
| 
|-
| 6.0
| align=center |
| colspan=3 | Pojezerje rest area
|-
| 8.4
| align=center | 2
| Ploče interchange
| 
| Connection to Ploče (via the D425) and Split (via the A1).The western terminus of the motorway.

Sources

External links
 

Motorways in Croatia
Proposed roads
Proposed transport infrastructure in Croatia